Gonzalo Pablo Castellani (born 10 August 1987 in Buenos Aires) is an Argentine footballer who plays for Unión La Calera as a midfielder.

Club career
Castellani started his professional career with local Ferro Carril Oeste, competing in Primera B Nacional with the Buenos Aires outfit. On 2 January 2010 he moved to Spain and signed for Villarreal CF, being assigned to its B team in Segunda División; he failed to make any appearances for the club during the season, due to the team's excessive number of foreign players.

Castellani made his official debut for Villarreal B on 16 January 2011, starting in a 0–2 away loss against Recreativo de Huelva. On 18 December he first appeared in La Liga with the main squad, replacing Cani in the 64th minute of a 1–2 defeat at CA Osasuna.

On 6 July 2012, after both squads' relegation, Castellani joined Godoy Cruz in his native country. Two years later he moved to Boca Juniors, also in the top division.

References

External links

1987 births
Living people
Footballers from Buenos Aires
Argentine people of Italian descent
Argentine footballers
Argentine expatriate footballers
Association football midfielders
Argentine Primera División players
Chilean Primera División players
Primera Nacional players
La Liga players
Segunda División players
Categoría Primera A players
Ferro Carril Oeste footballers
Godoy Cruz Antonio Tomba footballers
Boca Juniors footballers
Villarreal CF B players
Villarreal CF players
Club Atlético Lanús footballers
Defensa y Justicia footballers
Atlético Nacional footballers
San Lorenzo de Almagro footballers
Atlético Tucumán footballers
Unión La Calera footballers
Argentine expatriate sportspeople in Spain
Argentine expatriate sportspeople in Colombia
Expatriate footballers in Chile
Expatriate footballers in Spain
Expatriate footballers in Colombia